A trimethylsilyl group (abbreviated TMS) is a functional group in organic chemistry. This group consists of three methyl groups bonded to a silicon atom [−Si(CH3)3], which is in turn bonded to the rest of a molecule. This structural group is characterized by chemical inertness and a large molecular volume, which makes it useful in a number of applications.

A trimethylsilyl group bonded to a methyl group forms tetramethylsilane, which is abbreviated as TMS as well.

Compounds with trimethylsilyl groups are not normally found in nature. Chemists sometimes use a trimethylsilylating reagent to derivatize rather non-volatile compounds such as certain alcohols, phenols, or carboxylic acids by substituting a trimethylsilyl group for a hydrogen in the hydroxyl groups on the compounds. This way trimethylsiloxy groups [−O-Si(CH3)3] are formed on the molecule. A couple of examples of trimethylsilylating agents include trimethylsilyl chloride and bis(trimethylsilyl)acetamide. Trimethylsilyl groups on a molecule have a tendency to make it more volatile, often making the compounds more amenable to analysis by gas chromatography or mass spectrometry. An example of such trimethylsilylation is mentioned in the Brassicasterol article. Such derivatizations are often done on a small scale in special vials.

When attached to certain functional groups in a reactant molecule, trimethylsilyl groups may also be used as temporary protecting groups during chemical synthesis or some other chemical reactions.

In chromatography, derivitization of accessible silanol groups in a bonded stationary phase with trimethylsilyl groups is referred to as endcapping.

In an NMR spectrum, signals from atoms in trimethylsilyl groups in compounds will commonly have chemical shifts close to the tetramethylsilane reference peak at 0 ppm. Also compounds, such as high temperature silicone "stopcock" grease, which have polysiloxanes (often called silicones) in them will commonly show peaks from their methyl groups (attached to the silicon atoms) having NMR chemical shifts close to the tetramethylsilane standard peak, such as at 0.07 ppm in CDCl3.

Otherwise very reactive molecules can be isolated when enveloped by bulky trimethylsilyl groups. This effect can be observed in tetrahedranes.

Super silyl groups

Related to trimethylsilyl groups are "super" silyl groups of which there exist two varieties: A silicon group connected to three trimethylsilyl groups makes a tri(trimethylsilyl)silyl group (TTMSS or TMS3Si) and a silicon group connected to three tert-butyl groups. The TTMSS group was proposed in 1993 by Hans Bock. With a van der Waals volume of up to 7 cubic angstrom it surpasses the related TIPS group (around 2) and one potential application is its use as a temporary substituent promoting asymmetric induction for example in this diastereoselective one-pot reaction involving two sequential Mukaiyama aldol reactions:

TTMSS can also stand for tris(trimethylsilyl)silane, which is comparable as a chemical reagent to tributyltin hydride without the associated toxicity concern of organotin and tributyltin compounds. The reagent is employed in radical reductions, hydrosilylation and consecutive radical reactions.

Alcohol protection 

In organic synthesis, TMS group is used as a protecting group for alcohols.

Most common protection methods 

 Trimethylsilyl chloride (TMSCl) or trimethylsilyl trifluoromethanesulfonate (TMSOTf) and base (i.e. pyridine, triethylamine, or 2,6-lutidine) in dichloromethane
 TMSCl and lithium sulfide (Li2S) in acetonitrile

Most common deprotection methods 
 TMS groups are susceptible to cleavage upon treatment with HF-based reagents
 Tetrabutylammonium fluoride (Bu4NF) in THF
 Fluorosilicic acid (H2SiF6)
 Treatment with HCl in THF/water solution

See also
 Trimethylsilanol
 Trimethylsilyl chloride
 Tetramethylsilane
Trimethylsilyl fluoride is a byproduct in preparing diethylaminosulfur trifluoride (DAST) from sulfur tetrafluoride:
Et2NSiMe3 + SF4 → Et2NSF3  +  Me3SiF

References

External links 
Identification of Silylation Artifacts in Derivatization Reactions for Gas Chromatography

Silicon
Trimethylsilyl compounds